This article is about corruption in Tanzania.

Both grand and petty corruption are serious problems in Tanzania yet various comprehensive laws are in place to prevent corruption. It is largely due to a weak internal control and low or non-compliance with anti-corruption regulations within different government agencies. For instance, public procurement, taxation, and customs service are areas that are prone to corruption. 

On Transparency International's 2022 Corruption Perceptions Index, Tanzania scored 38 on a scale from 0 ("highly corrupt") to 100 ("very clean"). When ranked by score, Tanzania ranked 94th among the 180 countries in the Index, where the country ranked first is perceived to have the most honest public sector.  For comparison, the best score was 90 (ranked 1), the worst score was 12 (ranked 180), and the average score was 43.

Foreign companies have identified that corruption within those sectors poses potential obstacles for doing business in Tanzania as bribes are often demanded. It is also believed that the existing large informal sector, 48.1% of GDP, is associated with cumbersome business registration process which has created opportunities for corruption.

President John Magufuli launched a campaign against grand corruption and established a special court to handle the matter. As a result, corrupt officials were fired. These efforts and similar projects are internationally supported by Germany and the European Union. Before his death in office in March 2021, there were fears that such anti-corruption efforts would end when President Magufuli stepped down.

References

External links
Tanzania Corruption Profile from the Business Anti-Corruption Portal

Tanzania
Politics of Tanzania
Crime in Tanzania by type